This is a list of some of the cattle breeds considered in Italy to be wholly or partly of Italian origin. Some may have complex or obscure histories, so inclusion here does not necessarily imply that a breed is predominantly or exclusively Italian.

 Abruzzese
 Agerolese
 Bardigiana
 Bianca Val Padana
 Bruna Italiana
 Bruna Italiana Vecchio Ceppo
 Burlina
 Cabannina
 Calabrese
 Calvana
 Camandona
 Carniella
 Chianina
 Chianino-Maremmana
 Cinisara
 Demonte
 Frisona Italiana
 Friuli
 Garfagnina
 Grigia alpina
 Grigia di Val d'Adige
 Grigia di Val di Fiemme
 Grossetana
 Lucana
 Marchigiana
 Maremmana
 Modenese
 Modicana
 Mölltal
 Montana
 Ossolana
 Pasturina
 Perugina
 Pezzata Rossa d'Oropa
 Pezzata Rossa Italiana
 Piemontese
 Pinzgauer
 Pisana
 Podolica
 Pontremolese
 Pugliese del basso Veneto
 Pustertaler Sprinzen
 Reggiana
 Rendena
 Romagnola
 Romana
 Sarda
 Sardo Bruna
 Sardo-modicana
 Sicilian
 Valdarno
 Val di Chiana
 Valdostana Castana
 Valdostana Pezzata Nera
 Valdostana Pezzata Rossa
 Valtarese
 Varzese-Ottonese-Tortonese

References

 
Cattle